Taskan was a rural locality in Yagodninsky District, Magadan Oblast, Russian Far East.

There is a road leading to Yagodnoye to the southwest of Taskan and another to Elgen to the southeast.

Geography
This abandoned settlement is located in the Upper Kolyma Highlands by the confluence of the Mylga and the Taskan, a left tributary of the Kolyma that flows from the Chersky Range.

History
Taskan was established in the 1930s. In the 1940s, there was a food processing factory which employed mostly prisoners. In the 1960s, the first two-story wooden buildings were built, as the economy began to develop.
By 1993, the population had risen to about 850 inhabitants and there was a state farm that specialized in animal husbandry and the growing of vegetables. The population fell rapidly after the collapse of the USSR and only a residual population remained. According to the 2010 census only 30 people lived in Taskan. Finally the settlement was abolished in 2019.

Yevgenia Ginzburg (1904 - 1977), a Soviet author, served a term in Taskan as a nurse during her imprisonment in the 1940s under Stalin's regime.

See also
Journey into the Whirlwind

References

Former populated places in Magadan Oblast
1930s establishments in Russia
2019 disestablishments in Russia
Ghost towns in Siberia